Pühalepa is a village in Hiiumaa Parish, Hiiu County in northwestern Estonia.

Pühalepa Church

There is situated Pühalepa Church.

Gallery

References

Villages in Hiiu County